Smokejack Clay Pit is a  geological Site of Special Scientific Interest east of Cranleigh in Surrey. It is a Geological Conservation Review site.

This site exposes Lower Cretaceous rocks of the Weald Clay Group. Fossils of six orders of insects have been recorded and an unusual level of details has been preserved. It is the best Weald Clay reptile site, with crocodile teeth, coprolites and part of an Iguanodon. The holotype specimen of the fish eating theropod dinosaur, Baryonyx walkeri was discovered on the site.

References

Sites of Special Scientific Interest in Surrey
Geological Conservation Review sites
Geology of South-East England